Westfield is a city in Hampden County, in the Pioneer Valley of western Massachusetts, United States. Westfield was first settled by Europeans in 1660. It is part of the Springfield, Massachusetts Metropolitan Statistical Area. The population was 40,834 at the 2020 census.

History 

The area was originally inhabited by the Pocomtuc, and was called Woronoco (meaning "the winding land"). Trading houses were built in 1639 to 1640 by European settlers from the Connecticut Colony. Massachusetts asserted jurisdiction, and prevailed after a boundary survey. In 1647, Massachusetts made Woronoco part of Springfield. Land was “incrementally purchased from the Native Americans and granted by the Springfield town meeting to English settlers, beginning in 1658.” The area of Woronoco or "Streamfield" began to be permanently settled in the 1660s. In 1669, "Westfield" was incorporated as an independent town; in 1920, it would be re-incorporated as a city. The name Westfield would be named for being at the time the most westerly settlement. "Streamfield" was considered a name for the town for being settled in between two "streams" that flow downtown, the Westfield River and the Little River.

From its founding until 1725, Westfield was the westernmost settlement in the Massachusetts Colony, and portions of it fell within the Equivalent Lands. Town meetings were held in a church meeting house until 1839, when Town Hall was erected on Broad Street. This building also served as City Hall from 1920 to 1958. Due to its alluvial lands, the inhabitants of the Westfield area were entirely devoted to agricultural pursuits for about 150 years.

Early in the 19th century, the manufacture of bricks, whips, and cigars became economically important. At one point in the 19th century, Westfield was a prominent center of the buggy whip industry, and the city is still known as the "Whip City". Other firms produced bicycles, paper products, pipe organs, boilers and radiators, textile machinery, abrasives, wood products, and precision tools. Westfield transformed itself from an agricultural town into a thriving industrial city in the 19th century, but in the second half of the 20th century its manufacturing base was eroded by wage competition in the U.S. Southeast, then overseas.

Meanwhile, with cheap land and convenient access to east–west and north–south interstate highways, the north side developed into a warehousing center to C & S Wholesale, Home Depot, Lowes and other corporations. South of the river, the intersecting trends of growth of Westfield State University and declining manufacturing changed the city's character.  Students comprise some 15% of Westfield's population, and the old downtown business district caters increasingly to them while mainstream shopping relocates to a commercial strip called East Main Street, part of U.S. Route 20.

Only four buildings exceed four stories in height. Until a major fire on January 6, 1952, the Westfield Professional Building covered half a downtown city block and was six stories tall. The entire building was consumed with extensive damage to neighboring buildings because the fire department's ladder and snorkel vehicles weren't tall enough and the building did not have a sprinkler system. Subsequent zoning prohibited virtually all new construction over three stories, even after improvements in fire suppression technologies and vehicles became available. No building is allowed to be taller than the town's firetruck ladders.

In the early 20th century, Westfield was at the center of the Pure Food movement, an effort to require stricter standards on the production of food. Louis B. Allyn, a Westfield resident and pure foods expert for McClure's Magazine, lived in Westfield until his murder. In 1906, Congress passed the Pure Food and Drug Act of 1906. In June 2017, the administration of Massachusetts Governor Charlie Baker announced a $300,000 grant to the city for an industrial park expansion.

In 1939, Westfield became the first city in Massachusetts, as well as all of New England, to elect a female Mayor when Alice Burke defeated incumbent Raymond H. Cowing.

Geography

Westfield is located at  (42.129492, −72.745986). It is bordered on the north by Southampton, on the northeast by Holyoke, on the east by West Springfield, on the southeast by Agawam, on the south by Southwick, on the southwest by Granville, on the west by Russell, and on the northwest by Montgomery. Westfield is split into the "South Side" and the "North Side" by the Westfield River, and the northwestern section of town is known as Wyben.

Because of its large, steep and rocky upstream watershed, the river has a history of severe flood episodes, inundating adjacent parts of Westfield several times. In spite of a complicated system of pumps, dikes, waterways, and upstream dams, Westfield lies in a floodplain zone and is still considered flood-prone.

Westfield is bordered on the east by linear cliffs of volcanic trap rock known as East Mountain and Provin Mountain. They are part of the Metacomet Ridge, a mountainous trap rock ridgeline that stretches from Long Island Sound to nearly the Vermont border. Both mountains are traversed by the  Metacomet-Monadnock Trail, that also crosses the Westfield River with an ill-advised fording or a safer road-walk across the bridge at the junction of Routes 187 and 20. The next road obstacle for hikers in Westfield is the Massachusetts Turnpike, beneath which hikers can safely walk.

Westfield is on the fringe of the greater Northeast megalopolis—the most densely populated region of the United States—and has experienced substantial land development for suburban residential and commercial uses for the past six decades. Yet it borders hilltowns to the west that were depopulated of subsistence farmers in the 19th century as land became readily available on the western frontier. With population dipping below ten per square kilometer in some upland townships, forests are reverting almost to pre-settlement conditions with wild turkey, bears, coyotes and even moose returning after absences perhaps measured in centuries. This transition over a few miles from the 21st century urbanization to population densities nearly as low as early colonial times is notable if not unique.

Climate 

Notes

Demographics

At the 2010 census, there were 41,094 people, 15,335 households and 10,041 families residing in the city. The racial makeup of the city was 92.8% White, 1.6% African American, 0.3% Native American, 1.3% Asian, 0.0% Pacific Islander, 2.2% from other races, and 1.8% from two or more races. Hispanic or Latino of any race were 7.5% of the population.

There were 14,797 households, of which 31.5% had children under the age of 18 living with them, 53.0% were married couples living together, 10.6% had a female householder with no husband present, and 32.3% were non-families. Of all households 25.9% were made up of individuals, and 10.9% had someone living alone who was 65 years of age or older. The average household size was 2.54 and the average family size was 3.07.

Age distribution was 23.8% under the age of 18, 12.6% from 18 to 24, 28.0% from 25 to 44, 21.9% from 45 to 64, and 13.7% who were 65 years of age or older. The median age was 36 years. For every 100 females, there were 93.7 males. For every 100 females age 18 and over, there were 90.8 males.

The median household income was $45,240, and the median family income was $55,327. Males had a median income of $38,316 versus $27,459 for females. The per capita income for the city was $20,600. About 6.9% of families and 11.3% of the population were below the poverty line, including 16.2% of those under age 18 and 9.5% of those age 65 or over.

Government and politics
Westfield is governed by a mayor and a city council, elected every two years. The office of the mayor is responsible for a variety of services throughout the city, and the mayor also serves as chairman of the School Committee. The City Council meets the first and third Thursday of every month at 7:30 p.m. in City Hall.

Westfield was involved in a mitigation action regarding water contaminated with per- and polyfluoroalkyl substances.

The current mayor of Westfield is Michael A. McCabe. In the Massachusetts General Court, the current senator, representing the Second Hampden and Hampshire district, is John Velis. The representative for the Fourth Hampden district is Kelly Pease.

The Westfield City Council is composed of the following members:

The current city council president is Breant Bean II.

Public safety
According to NeighborhoodScout in 2020 violent crime in Westfield such as armed robbery, aggravated assault, rape or murder occurs at a rate of 1 in every 375, or 3 in every 1000.

Arts and culture

Points of interest 
 Amelia Park Ice Rink and Memorial Garden
 Stanley Park of Westfield
 The Metacomet-Monadnock Trail
 East Mountain
 United States Whip Company Complex
 Columbia Greenway Rail Trail

Education
Westfield's public school system consists of one preschool, seven elementary schools, two middle schools and two high schools.

Preschools 
 Fort Meadow Early Childhood Center
 Westfield Area Head Start. Head Start is no longer referenced on the Westfield schools' website.

Elementary schools 

 Abner Gibbs Elementary School
 Franklin Avenue Elementary School
 Highland Elementary School
 Munger Hill Elementary School
 Paper Mill Elementary School
 Southampton Road Elementary School
 Russell Elementary School

Intermediate schools 
 Westfield Intermediate School (On former grounds of the North Middle School)

Middle schools 

 Westfield Middle School

High schools 
 Westfield High School
 Westfield Technical Academy

Private schools 
St. Mary Preschool and Pre-K
St. Mary Elementary School
St. Mary Middle School
St. Mary High School
The White Oak School

Higher education
The city is home to Westfield State University.

Library

The Westfield Athenaeum is a free library that is open to the public. It is located in Westfield, Massachusetts and is part of the CW MARS consortium. The library was incorporated by an act of the Massachusetts Legislature, Chapter 88, in 1864.

The Westfield Athenaeum opened at 26 Main Street on January 1, 1868, with an annual membership fee of $2. In 1895, it became free to Westfield residents. In 1899, the library was moved and a new building was dedicated at 6 Elm Street, the former home of James Fowler.

The Athenaeum is a non-profit organization, governed by a board of directors. Its mission is to "enrich the community of Westfield by providing open access to educational, cultural, recreational and informational resources and programs."

In fiscal year 2008, the city of Westfield spent 0.87% ($811,000) of its budget on its public library—approximately $19 per person, per year ($25.04 adjusted for inflation to 2022).

Media 
 The Westfield News Group LLC., publishers of The Westfield News, PennySaver, The Longmeadow News and The Enfield Press

Transportation

Major highways
The Massachusetts Turnpike crosses Westfield just north of Westfield Center. The "Mass Pike" is part of Interstate 90 extending east to Boston and west to Albany and across the United States to Seattle.

Westfield's main north–south thoroughfare is U.S. 202/Route 10, which includes parts of Southwick Road, S. Maple Street, W. Silver Street, Pleasant Street, Court Street, Broad Street, Elm Street, and Southampton Road. At the intersection of Southampton Road and North Road, Route 10 continues on Southampton Road toward Southampton while U.S. 202 follows North Road toward Holyoke.

Apart from limited-access I-90, the main east–west thoroughfare is U.S. 20, which includes parts of Russell Road, Franklin Street, Elm Street, Main Street, and Springfield Road. Route 187 also ends in Westfield. Other main roads include Western Avenue, Granville Road, Union Street, and Montgomery Road. East Mountain Road is the longest road in Westfield.  In November 2016, Massachusetts Governor Charlie Baker announced a $1.93 million grant to the city for upgrades to its segment of U.S. Route 20.

Great River Bridge project 

A notable choke point for north–south travel is the Great River Bridge, commonly known as the "Green Bridge", over the Westfield River. This is a three-lane through truss bridge. As of August 2007, there was an active project to create a second bridge just to the east (downstream). The new bridge is a similar through-truss bridge with two spans totaling . After the second bridge was completed, the existing bridge was refurbished; each bridge now carries traffic in one direction. Blessed Sacrament Church on North Elm Street was torn down for this project to start. The church was reconstructed on Holyoke Road and was finished in October 2009. The new bridge opened for traffic and the old one was closed for renovations on August 18, 2009. The old bridge reopened in July 2011, with each bridge carrying traffic in one direction.

Rail

Westfield is at the junction of the former east–west Boston and Albany Railroad and a former north–south spur of the New York, New Haven and Hartford Railroad (now a rail trail south of the junction). The town last had eastbound passenger service in 1954, local Albany, New York – Boston, Massachusetts service operated by the New York Central Railroad; and Westfield last had local westbound service in 1953. But Pioneer Valley Railroad, a short line, and CSX, provide freight service. More than 35 motor freight carriers with nearby terminals provide competitive freight service locally and to all distant points. Amtrak's Lake Shore Limited, Vermonter and Connecticut Valley service continue to operate in Springfield, Massachusetts, 9.6 miles to the east.

Bus
The city is presently served by multiple Pioneer Valley Transit Authority (PVTA) bus routes:

 R10: Westfield / Westfield State University / West Springfield via Route 20
 Provides service between Westfield and Springfield via Route 20 and West Springfield.
 Connects with many other public transit services at Springfield Union Station:
 Most Springfield-area PVTA routes, for service to Holyoke, Northampton, Chicopee, Agawam, Ludlow, Longmeadow, East Longmeadow, and other areas of Springfield.
 Amtrak Northeast Regional, Lake Shore Limited, Hartford Line, and Vermonter passenger rail service.
 Peter Pan and Greyhound intercity bus service.
 Hartford Line, a regional rail service to Hartford and New Haven, CT operated by CTrail.
 B23: Holyoke / Westfield via Holyoke Community College
 Provides service between Westfield Center and Holyoke Transportation Center via Holyoke Community College.
 WSU Shuttle
 Provides service between Westfield Center and Westfield State University when school is in session. Also provides service to the Horace Mann Center at 333 Western Ave.

Air
Westfield-Barnes Regional Airport in Westfield has charter passenger services.

Bradley International Airport at Windsor Locks, Connecticut,  (40 minutes drive) to the south, has scheduled flights by most airlines.

Notable people

 Edward Bancroft (1744–1821), physician and double-agent spy during the American Revolution
 Lou Barlow (born 1966), American alternative rock musician and songwriter
 Kacey Bellamy (born 1987), Olympian, 2010 Winter Olympics, Women's Ice Hockey Silver Medalist
 Sybil Moseley Bingham (1792–1848) teacher, missionary in Hawaiian Islands
 Emma Helen Blair (1851–1911) historian, journalist and editor who attended high school in town
 Asahel Bush (1824–1913), printer and publisher the Oregon Statesman newspaper; His estate is now preserved as Bush's Pasture Park and his home, Asahel Bush House, is on the National Register of Historic Places
 Joseph Buell Ely (1881–1956), 52nd Governor of Massachusetts
 Richard Falley Jr. (1740–1808) an ensign at the Battle of Bunker Hill and armorer during the American Revolutionary War
 Ray Fitzgerald (1904–1977), Major League Baseball player who died in town
 Frederick H. Gillett (1851–1935), U.S. Congressman, Speaker of the U.S. House of Representatives
 Manuel Gonzales (1913–1993), comics artist
 James H. Gray Sr. (1916–1986), Georgia politician
 Ferdinand Vandeveer Hayden (1829–1887) pioneering geologist
 Thomas Ingersoll (1749–1812), early settler of Ingersoll, Ontario, and for whom that town is named
 Neil Jenney, artist
 William Allen Johnson, organ builder; Johnson Organs
 Jackie French Koller, author and painter
 Walt Kowalczyk (born 1935), professional football player with the Philadelphia Eagles, Dallas Cowboys and Oakland Raiders
 Jesse Leach, rock singer and musician
 Grey Lock (1670–1750), Abenaki warrior chieftain
 Jim Matheos (born 1962), guitarist, best known of Fates Warning 
 Mary L. Moreland (1859–1918), minister, evangelist, suffragist, author
 Gilbert Clifford Noble (1860–1936), Founder of Barnes and Noble Book Stores
 Ralph E. Van Norstrand, minority leader of the Connecticut General Assembly, 1979—1985; Speaker of the Connecticut House of Representatives, 1985—1987
 Don Pardo, longtime Saturday Night Live announcer
 Gorham Parks, U.S. Congressman from Maine and American Consul in Rio de Janeiro
 Rufus Parks, Wisconsin politician
 Dale Quarterly, part-time ARCA Menards Series West racecar driver
 Frederic Rzewski, composer
 William Shepard, Revolutionary War general
 Nettie Stevens, early geneticist who discovered chromosomes determined one's sex
 Walter Scott Story (1879–1955), author
 Clara Harrison Stranahan (1831–1905), author; founder of Barnard College
 Rick Sullivan, current Secretary of Energy and Environmental Affairs for the Commonwealth of Massachusetts and the former Mayor of Westfield
 Edward Taylor (–1729) poet, physician, and pastor
 Adonis Terry (1864–1915), former MLB pitcher for four teams
 Alfred Topliff (1799–1879), Wisconsin State Assemblyman and surveyor
 Mark Trafton, U.S. congressman
 Daniel P. Trant, NBA player (Boston Celtics), killed on September 11, 2001 in the World Trade Center attack

Bands from Westfield
 Killswitch Engage, metalcore band
 Outpatients, hardcore/metal band
 Sebadoh, indie rock band
 Within the Ruins, deathcore band
 Deep Wound, hardcore punk band
 The Prozacs, pop punk band

References

External links

 City of Westfield official website
 A Record of Marriages, Births and Deaths in Westfield, Massachusetts Prior to the Year 1700 – Communicated by the Rev. Emerson Davis of that town, Corresponding Member of the New England Historic-Genealogical Society
 MHC Reconnaissance Town Survey Report: Westfield, Massachusetts Historical Commission, 1982.

 
1660 establishments in Massachusetts
Cities in Hampden County, Massachusetts
Cities in Massachusetts
Populated places established in 1660
Russian communities in the United States
Russian-American culture in Massachusetts
Springfield metropolitan area, Massachusetts
Ukrainian communities in the United States